Thomas Michaelsen (born September 14, 1985) is the first lacrosse player ever to be drafted professionally in Major League Lacrosse and the National Lacrosse League from St. John's University. Thomas is currently the President and Founder of 365Lax Inc., a lacrosse company based in Long Island that provides lacrosse-specific services for players in grades kindergarten through twelfth grade.

Early life 
Michaelsen was born and raised in Bethpage, New York on Long Island. He grew up with two older sisters, a twin brother Trevor who also played with him at St. John's University and a younger brother. In high school, Michaelsen was named All-County in soccer, wrestling and lacrosse, and also earned All-American in lacrosse. Michaelsen is considered one of the best athletes of all time in Bethpage history and Top 5 Lacrosse players all time from Bethpage.

Lacrosse career

Collegiate lacrosse
Immediately attending St. John's University on a full scholarship, Michaelsen played and starred in every game and led the team in points ever since. In his senior season, he was named a National Strength and Conditioning Association (NSCA) All-American, earned the Francis A. McCall Memorial Award as the team MVP and also became the fifth player in St. John's history to reach 100 career points and first player since the reinstatement in 2004 to surpass 100 point. In his collegiate career, Michaelsen tallied 71 goals and 46 assists for 117 points, making him fourth in career assists, fifth on the all-time leading scorer list and tied for fifth in career goals in the St. John's record books. As a sophomore in 2006, he earned the team's offensive MVP award. Michaelsen was the first player to earn All-ECAC honors in 2007, and in May became the first player since 1990 to be selected to play in the annual USILA Senior North/South All-Star Game.

Professional lacrosse
After college, Michaelsen was drafted 42nd overall in the 2008 Major League Lacrosse Collegiate Draft by the San Francisco Dragons and 24th overall in the National Lacrosse League Entry Draft by the Minnesota Swarm. Michaelsen ended his professional career as a member of the Swarm in 2009.

Business endeavors
Tom Michaelsen is the founder of 365Lax Inc, a company that provides lacrosse services all year round for both boys and girls in grades 12 and under. Additionally, Michaelsen is the co-founder of the US Academy of Lacrosse, a sports complex located in Farmingdale, New York

References

1985 births
Living people
American lacrosse players
People from Bethpage, New York
Sportspeople from New York (state)